Matar Henrikki Samba, better known as Näääk (born 29 March 1983), is a Swedish rapper of Gambian and Finnish ancestry.

Career and early life
Näääk was born and raised in the Stockholm suburb Rinkeby to a Finnish mother and a Gambian father. He moved to Gullmarsplan when he started high school and he have been living there ever since. A couple of years after high school (the beginning of 2000), he began to record lyrics that he wrote himself. This hobby continued for five more years, until some producers from the studio Safe House, run by the record label Slang Musik in Stockholm, heard him and wanted him to guest some songs from other Swedish rappers. He continued with his song-writing at the same time as he was the guest rapper of many songs. His Wiley interpretation "Mina Gangsters" ("My Gangsters") is today an underground classic with hundred thousands of views on YouTube.

Year 2009, Näääk released his debut album Näääk Vem? ("Näääk Who?") which he recorded with Safe House Studios during 2008. The debut was nominated for the prize of "This Years Rap Album" on the Swedish radio station Sveriges Radio P3's "Gold Awards", but did not win anything. Many producers contributed to the songs from the album and it ended up as an album with g-funk-inspired beats, melodic loops and a general funky sound. His album reminds of artist such as Devin the Dude and Snoop Dogg. The latest album, Mannen utan mask ("The man without mask"), was released on 26 September 2012 and was declared as a more mature album, unlike "Näääk Vem?".

When Näääk Vem? was released, the rap duo Näääk & Nimo from Stockholm was formed, who often guest each other's songs and they tour together as a team. Jetlag and Blåser min rök ("Blow my smoke") are two singles that Näääk released with Nimo as the guest rapper, which were on the top list on Swedish radio stations for a long time.

Personal life
In an interview in 2010, Näääk said he was single and according to him he did not have any desire of being in a relationship either. But since his younger days, his dream girl has always been Halle Berry.

He claims that he got his name Näääk, which he has been using since 2003, from a friend who tried to spell the word "Negro" in Finnish, but misspelled it and wrote "N-Ä-Ä-Ä-K-E-R-R-I" instead of the right spelling; "N-E-E-K-E-R-I".

Discography

Albums
 Näääk Vem? (21 October 2009)
 Mannen utan mask (26 September 2012)

Singles
2007: "Mina Gangsters"
2012: "Jetlag"

Other and featured singles

References

External links
Safe House

Swedish rappers
Musicians from Stockholm
Swedish-language singers
1983 births
Living people
Swedish people of Finnish descent
Swedish people of Gambian descent